The West Virginia University School of Medicine is the professional school for the study of medicine and other health professions at West Virginia University in Morgantown, West Virginia. The medical school was established in 1902 as the first such institution in the state of West Virginia, and remains one of only three medical schools in the state.

The school is organized into three campuses. The main campus in Morgantown is located in the WVU Health Sciences Center, a 2,000,000 sq.ft. medical complex that is also home to the Schools of Dentistry, Nursing, Pharmacy and Public Health. All medical students spend their first two years before moving on to complete their clinical work during their final two years in the program. Students can choose to complete their rotations at either the Morgantown campus, the Charleston Campus in the state capital of Charleston or the Eastern Campus in Martinsburg. Students who remain in Morgantown will practice at J.W. Ruby Memorial Hospital, a 690-bed academic medical center and Level 1 Trauma Center. Charleston Campus is located the Charleston Area Medical Center's Memorial Hospital campus. WVU's Eastern Campus provides a community-based, direct clinical experience and teaches students in Berkeley Medical Center in Martinsburg and Jefferson Medical Center in Ranson. All hospitals are part of the WVU Medicine system.

Graduate medical education
The WVU School of Medicine is fully accredited by the Accreditation Council for Graduate Medical Education (ACGME) and is a participating member of the National Resident Matching Program (NRMP). Fully accredited residencies, internships and fellowships at West Virginia University include:

 Anesthesiology Residency
 Behavioral Medicine and Psychiatry Residency
 Dermatology Residency
 Emergency Medicine Residency
 Family Medicine Residency
 Rural Family Medicine Residency
 Internal Medicine Residency
 Pediatrics Residency
 Neurology Residency
 Neurosurgery Residency
 Obstetrics and Gynecology Residency
 Occupational Medicine Residency
 Ophthalmology Residency
 Orthopedics Residency
 Otolaryngology Residency
 Pathology Residency
 Plastic Surgery Residency
Radiation Oncology Residency
 Radiology Residency
 General Surgery Residency
 Urology Residency

Other graduate-level professional programs include:

 Athletic Training (MS)
 Biomedical Sciences (MS, PhD)
 Clinical and Translational Sciences (Certificate, MS, PhD)
 Health Sciences (MS)
 Exercise Physiology (MS)
 MD/PhD Scholars Program
 Occupational Therapy
 Physical Therapy
 Pathologists' Assistant
 Physician Assistant

Undergraduate medical education 
West Virginia University School of Medicine includes the following undergraduate professional programs:
Exercise Physiology
 Health Informatics and Information Management
 Immunology and Medical Microbiology
 Medical Laboratory Science
 Occupational Therapy

Accreditation 
West Virginia University School of Medicine is currently accredited by the Liaison Committee on Medical Education, the Accreditation Council for Graduate Medical Education, the Accreditation Council for Continuing Medical Education, the National Accrediting Agency for Clinical Laboratory Sciences, the Accreditation Council for Occupational Therapy Education of the American Occupational Therapy Association, and the Commission on Accreditation in Physical Therapy Education.

References

External links
 

Educational institutions established in 1902
Medical schools in West Virginia
West Virginia University
1902 establishments in West Virginia